Joseph Henry Lewis (March 7, 1944 – August 31, 2012) was an American martial artist, actor, karateka, and kickboxer. As a fighter, Lewis gained fame for his matches in the 1960s and 1970s, and was nicknamed "the Muhammad Ali of karate." He has twice been voted the greatest fighter in karate history, having won innumerable karate tournaments, and has attained the titles of "United States Heavyweight Kickboxing Champion," "World Heavyweight Full Contact Karate Champion," and "United States National Black Belt Kata Champion."

His friend and training partner Bruce Lee coined him "The Greatest Karate Fighter of All Time." He was also named by the STAR System World Kickboxing Ratings as the "STAR Historic Undisputed Heavyweight World Champion" and is credited on their site as the "Father of Modern Kickboxing".

Early life and training
Joseph Henry Lewis was born on March 7, 1944, in Knightdale, North Carolina. In 1962, Lewis enlisted in the US Marine Corps. He was stationed at Marine Corps Air Station Cherry Point in Havelock, North Carolina from July 20, 1962, to April 12, 1964. He was one of the first Marines stationed in Vietnam, there meeting Anthony (Rocky) Graziano.

From February 7 to July 14, 1966, he was stationed at Marine Corps Base Camp Lejeune, North Carolina, at which time he was released from active duty. Upon returning to the US, he began a winning tournament career. From 1967 to 1968, he studied privately with the influential Wing-Chun kung fu teacher, Jeet Kune Do founder, and Chinese/Hollywood movie legend Bruce Lee.

Hong Kong cinema historian Bey Logan says Lewis was the original pick of Bruce Lee for the villain Colt in Way of the Dragon, but that Lee and Lewis either had a falling out or Lewis had a scheduling conflict, and thus Chuck Norris was tapped instead.

Karate career
In 1966, with only 22 months of training, Lewis won the grand championship of the 1st tournament he entered, The U.S. Nationals promoted by Jhoon Rhee. Lewis defeated 7 opponents before defeating Thomas Carroll by a 2–0 decision. Lewis reigned as the U.S. Nationals grand champion from 1966 to 1969. At the 1967 Nationals in Washington, Lewis won the championship by defeating Mitchell Bobrow in the semi-final and beating Frank Hargrove 3–2 in the finals. Previously, Lewis defeated Hargrove in New York City at 'Henry Cho's Karate Tournament'. During that time, he also defeated Chuck Norris .

In 1966, at the Long Beach Internationals, Lewis lost an upset decision to Allen Steen. In 1967, Lewis defeated Wieland Norris (brother of Chuck Norris), Steve LaBounty, Frank Knoll, and Frank Hargrove (for the third time).

In February, 1968, Lewis and five other top-rated fighters (Bob Wall, Skipper Mullins, J. Pat Burleson, David Moon, and Fred Wren) fought in the first World Professional Karate Championships (WPKC) promoted by Jim Harrison. This was the first "professional" tournament in karate history and took place in Harrison's dojo in Kansas City. The rules allowed "heavy contact." Lewis won the tournament and was paid one dollar, thus officially making him the first professional champion in karate history.

At the 1968 'Orient vs. U.S. Tournament', promoted by Aaron Banks, Lewis lost a decision to Japanese-American N. Tanaka. At the 'First Professional Karate Tournament' in Dallas, Texas, Lewis won the championship trophy by decisioning Larry Whitner, Phil Ola, and Skipper Mullins.

In August, 1968, Lewis was defeated by Victor Moore at the second professional karate tournament in history. The event was called the World's Hemisphere Karate Championships and it took place in San Antonio, Texas; promoted by Robert Trias and Atlee Chittim. Moore and Lewis split the championship purse of $1,000. That same year, Lewis defeated Louis Delgado (who had beaten Chuck Norris the year before).

On November 24, 1968, at the Waldorf Astoria Hotel in New York City, Lewis won Aaron Banks', World Professional Karate Championships by defeating Victor Moore to win the World Heavyweight Title. Lewis was paid $600 for his title winning effort.

In 1970, Lewis lost in yet another upset to John Natividad at the All-Star Team Championships in Long Beach, California. However, at the 'Battle of Atlanta' promoted by Joe Corley, Joe Lewis defeated Mitchell Bobrow in a closely contested come-from-behind victory for the Heavyweight Championship, and Joe Hayes for the Grand Championship.

At Ed Parker's 1972 'International Karate Championships', Darnell Garcia scored an upset victory over Lewis.

At the 1972 Grande Nationals in Memphis Tennessee, Joe Lewis beat Jerry Piddington winning his grande title match in a 1 – 0 victory.

Joe Lewis was voted by the top fighters and promoters as the greatest karate fighter of all time in 1983. Chuck Norris and Bill Wallace tied for second place. Gene Lebell has credited Joe as the person who "brought us full-contact karate."

1974 was to be a busy year for Joe Lewis and it would mark his final year in tournament karate competition. In May, Lewis lost to Charles Curry in New York at the Hidy Ochiai National Karate Tournament. That same month, Lewis won the PAWAK tournament which lasted from May 11 – May 12. Lewis scored victories over Frank Harvey, Smiley Urquidez, Benny Urquidez, and Cecil Peoples in the elimination matches. Joe won the championship with a 4–3 points decision over Steve Sanders. Finally, at Mike Anderson's, 'Top 10 National Professional Karate Tournament', Lewis lost to Everett "Monster Man" Eddy in the finals.

Joe Lewis was a veteran of the Vietnam War where he served in the communications field. His military decorations include: Marine Corps Good Conduct Medal, National Defense Service Medal, Armed Forces Expeditionary Medal, and "Expert" Rifle Badge. He acted in films and on TV, and was briefly married to actress Barbara Leigh. Throughout his life, he continued to give seminars and work in the entertainment industry.

Kickboxing and full-contact Karate career
Starting in 1967, Lewis began training privately with Bruce Lee. Lewis also began training with former heavyweight boxing contender Joe Orbillo, enhancing his skills.

In late 1969 promoter Lee Faulkner contacted Joe Lewis to fight in his upcoming United States Karate Championships. Lewis had retired from point fighting at the time but agreed to fight if Faulkner would promote a full-contact karate bout with Lewis and an opponent who would fight to the knockout. Faulkner agreed.  As Lewis and Greg Baines entered the ring wearing boxing gloves the announcer identified the fighters as "kickboxers". That night Joe Lewis won the first-ever kickboxing bout in North America on January 17, 1970, with a second-round knockout over Greg Baines.

Previous to this bout, Lewis defeated Chuck Lemmons in point karate at the US Pro Team Karate finals that were held prior to the kickboxing main event.

On June 20, 1970, in Dallas, Texas, Lewis defended his United States Kickboxing Association heavyweight title against "Big" Ed Daniel at the U.S.A. Professional Open Karate Championships promoted by Lee Faulkner and Allen Steen. Daniels had a background in professional wrestling, and amateur boxing, as well as having received his black belt from Lewis' original teacher and being a police officer at the time. He also enjoyed a vast weight and size advantage over Lewis. In a veritable David vs Goliath bout, Lewis knocked out Daniel in 2 rounds. In a later rematch, Lewis KO'd Daniel in 3 rounds.

On January 24, 1971, at the 2nd Annual United Nations Open Karate Championships promoted by Aaron Banks, Lewis knocked out Ronnie Barkoot at 1:25 of the first round. At another Banks promotion; United States Championship Kickboxing Bouts, Lewis scored a 3rd-round knockout over "Atlas" Jesse King.

In total, Lewis defended his United States Heavyweight Kickboxing title with 8 straight knockouts between 1970/71. The 1970–71 rules for US kickboxing included striking, kicking, knees, elbows and footsweeps. Only crescent kicks and round kicks were permitted to the head.

Lewis is the first kickboxer to be featured in both The Ring boxing magazine and Sports Illustrated. Although promoter Lee Faulkner attempted to organize a legitimate "world" title fight between US champ Joe Lewis and a Thai kickboxing champion, a fight never materialized.

By the end of 1971, interest in kickboxing had hit an all-time low, with promoters unable to attract a crowd to a kickboxing event. Lewis retired as undefeated United States Heavyweight Kickboxing champion in 1971. His record as the undisputed United States heavyweight kickboxing champion was a perfect 10–0 with 10 KO's.

September 14, 1974 on ABC's Wide World of Entertainment promoter Mike Anderson introduced PKA 'full-contact' karate. In the bouts, competitors wore foam hand and foot protection and fought to the knockout (Kickboxing rules allowed for leg kicks: full-contact karate rules did not permit kicks to the legs). Lewis, the retired US Heavyweight Kickboxing champion was accustomed to full contact fighting. In 1974 he beat his only opponent in the new sport of full contact karate with a 2nd round ridge hand knockout over Yugoslavia's Frank Brodar in Los Angeles, California to win the Professional Karate Association (PKA) Heavyweight full-contact karate title.

The original 1974 PKA world champions, including Joe Lewis (heavyweight), Jeff Smith (light heavyweight) and Bill 'Superfoot' Wallace (middleweight) received so much fanfare from the PKA title wins and resultant publicity in popular martial arts magazines that their status as "legends of the karate world" was guaranteed. Lewis advanced his public persona the next year by appearing on the cover of Playgirl magazine. In 1975 Joe Lewis was inducted into the Black Belt magazine Hall of Fame as the 1974 full contact karate "fighter of the year".

In a 1975 comeback fight in Hawaii Lewis lost a 3-round decision (non title) to Teddy Limoz in Hawaii, and in September, he lost a 7-round decision to Ross Scott after suffering a dislocated shoulder. Lewis was stripped of the PKA World Heavyweight championship title after contract disputes. In 1977, Lewis was the martial arts coordinator of the movie Circle of Iron, and continued his acting career by starring in Jaguar Lives in 1978 and Force: Five in 1981.

At the age of 39, in 1983, Joe Lewis launched a comeback which saw him earn a top-10 PKA world ranking. Neglecting an extended training time to begin his comeback for a title Lewis defeated T. Morrison by KO, decisioned Charleton Young and Curtis Crandall and knocked out Melvin Cole. On April 16, Lewis lost a decision to Mark Georgantas in an upset, in a fight in which Lewis focused on getting a body punch KO and suffered a serious cut. On August 10, Lewis suffered a disappointing 4th round stoppage due to yet another cut to US heavyweight champion Kerry Roop for the PKA US heavyweight title. Lewis retired after the defeat. Joe Lewis's competitive career in kickboxing and PKA full-contact karate ended with a combined record of 17 wins and 4 losses with 15 wins obtained by knockout, a K.O ratio of 71.4% (The PKA World title record was 5 wins 4 losses). In 1990 Lewis (198 lbs) fought one last exhibition kickboxing/karate match with friend Bill Wallace (166 lbs) on pay per view. Both Lewis and Wallace were refused a boxing license because of their age. Though it was only an exhibition, many people believed it was the main event of the night due to the publicity it attracted. The fight was billed "Speed vs Power". The exhibition ended with two judges scoring a tie and one judge giving the fight to Wallace in the exhibition event, however Lewis later recounted that he was warned not to cross the line with Wallace, as Lewis enjoyed a 30-pound advantage on Wallace.

Fighting style
Joe Lewis' seemingly dominating characteristic as a fighter was his phenomenal strength. Thanks to a youth of weight lifting and collegiate wrestling, Lewis was an intimidating adversary and would use his relentless power to see him through. He was considered a very intimidating presence in the Karate tournament scene. However, he was also very fast, which allowed him to score his thunderous signature side kick on his opponents. In later years, Joe would be able to replicate some of Bruce Lee's legendary speed feats, such as asking a volunteer to block his punches, which would prove too fast to be blocked. As a Karate point fighter, Lewis was famous for his lead side kick, particularly his left. At one point he was asked by on-lookers why he only used that technique. He replied: "Why not? They can't block it." He also developed a fast back fist punch, and failing that, he would grab his opponent's dogi and use the reverse punch until the fight was stopped.

After cross-training in Boxing with Sugar Ray Robinson and Joe Orbillio, and then training Jeet Kune Do with Bruce Lee, Lewis would gain a unique view on how to handle distance and closing the gap. His preferred techniques as a full contact Karate and Kickboxing fighter were his trademark side kick, and the hook punch, particularly the left, typically delivered in combinations, he also claimed that it was typical of his style to use low kicks as early as his first kickboxing bout against Greg Baines, and once referred to them as his "main weapon". Thanks to his background as a wrestler, and his studying of Shōrin-ryū Karate (both Shobayashi and Matsubayashi), Okinawan Kenpo,  Judo, Jeet Kune Do, Boxing and Tai Chi, Joe Lewis was a very well-rounded fighter.

Joe Lewis as a teacher devoted to instructing martial artists in the Five Angles of Attack and other principles which he learned from Bruce Lee's Kung Fu and then modified through his full contact experience.

Health issues and death 
In July 2011, he was diagnosed with a malignant brain tumor. Doctors told him that if he did nothing, he'd have six to eight weeks to live. On July 18, surgeons removed the tumor. "He had the best doctors, and they think they did a good job of getting it all out," said Dennis Nackord, Lewis' senior black belt.

Lewis died one year and forty-five days later, on the morning of August 31, 2012, at Coatesville Veterans Affairs Medical Center in Coatesville, Pennsylvania. He was 68 years old. The battle with cancer lasted 13 months, and the cancer spread to his left shoulder and hip before he passed away. He was buried at Knightdale Baptist Church Cemetery, Knightdale, Wake County, North Carolina.

Legacy and popular culture
Lewis left behind his own system of martial arts teaching, called the Joe Lewis American Karate Systems which focuses on full-contact fighting. Due to his role in developing and promoting the sport's first event in the American continent, Joe Lewis is considered to be the "Father of Kickboxing" in the western world, and he's also been called "the man who brought us Full Contact Karate." Black Belt Magazine describes his process of solo training in boxing and combining those techniques with his Karate techniques as "the result is the martial sport now known as Kickboxing." His efforts in these fields eventually resulted in the Mixed martial arts competition of today.

In the cover story February 1993 issue of Black Belt magazine, Joe Lewis states that his proteges' John and Jim Graden are his choice to carry the torch of his system after his death. ("The Passing of the Torch Legendary Fighter Joe Lewis Grooms His Successors")

The character from the Street Fighter series of fighting video games, Ken Masters, was based upon Joe Lewis' likeness and trajectory, both being Americans having learned a traditional karate style in Japan, then returning home to become the United States Champion, to worldwide acclaim. Masters' characteristic red uniform and blond hair were patterned after a popular cover in which Joe Lewis appeared, sporting that same look.  Lewis, with his personal mixture of Karate, Boxing and Jeet Kune Do, represents the eclectic approach that some of the American martial artists took towards more traditional martial arts. In the same vein, Ken Masters sports a flashier fighting style than his best friend Ryu.

The American kickboxer, Joe, from the Street Fighter's first game, also seems to have been based in Joe Lewis.

Lewis is indirectly referenced in a scene from the 2019 Quentin Tarantino film Once Upon a Time in Hollywood when Bruce Lee (played by Mike Moh) refers to him as "[T]hat white kickboxing a--hole." to differentiate him from the black boxer Joe Louis.

Kickboxing record

|-
|
|Loss
| style="text-align:left" |  Kerry Roop
|
|Akron, Ohio, USA
|TKO (cut)
| 4
| 
|16–4
|For PKA US Heavyweight title.
|-
|
|Win
| style="text-align:left" |  Melvin Cole
|
|Atlanta, Georgia, USA
|TKO (referee stoppage)
| 4
| 1:57
|16–3
|
|-
|
|Loss
| style="text-align:left" |  Tom Hall
|
|Atlantic City, New Jersey, USA
|Decision (unanimous)
| 
| 
|15–3
|
|-
|
|Win
| style="text-align:left" |  Charlton Young
|Battle of Atlanta Karate Championships
|Atlanta, Georgia, USA
|Decision
| 7
| 3:00
|15–2
|
|-
|
|Win
| style="text-align:left" |  Curtis Crandall
|
|Charlotte, North Carolina, USA
|Decision
| 6
| 3:00
|14–2
|
|-
|
|Win
| style="text-align:left" |  Bill Morrison
|
|Greenville, North Carolina, USA
|KO
| 3
| 
|13–2
|
|-
|
|Loss
| style="text-align:left" |  Ross Scott
|
|Atlantic City, New Jersey, USA
|Decision
| 7
| 3:00
|12–2
|
|-
|
|Loss
| style="text-align:left" |  Teddy Limoz
|World Series of Martial Arts Championships
|Honolulu, Hawaii, USA
|Decision
| 3
| 3:00
|12–1
|For WSMAC Openweight World title. Loses PKA Heavyweight World title.
|-
|
|Win
| style="text-align:left" |  Ron Clay
|World Series of Martial Arts Championships
|Honolulu, Hawaii, USA
|KO (punches)
| 1
| 1:55
|12–0
|
|-
|
|Win
| style="text-align:left" |  Franc Brodar
|
|Los Angeles, California, USA
|KO (ridge hand)
| 2
| 
|11–0
|Wins PKA Heavyweight World title.
|-
|
|Win
| style="text-align:left" |  Herbie Thompson
|Florida State Karate Championships
|Florida, USA
|TKO (retirement)
| 2
| 
|10–0
|
|-
|
|Win
| style="text-align:left" |  Victor Moore
|
|Kansas City, Kansas, USA
|KO
| 
| 
|9–0
|
|-
|
|Win
| style="text-align:left" |  Bob Smith
|
|St. Louis, Missouri, USA
|KO
| 2
| 
|8–0
|Defends USKA Heavyweight title.
|-
|
|Win
| style="text-align:left" |  Ed Daniel
|
|Houston, Texas, USA
|KO (body kick)
| 3
| 
|7–0
|Defends USKA Heavyweight title.
|-
|
|Win
| style="text-align:left" |  Jesse King
|US Championship Kickboxing
|New York City, New York, USA
|KO
| 2
| 2:30
|6–0
|Rematch on same night. Defends USKA Heavyweight title.
|-
|
|Win
| style="text-align:left" |  Jesse King
|US Championship Kickboxing
|New York City, New York, USA
|KO
| 1
| 
|5–0
|Defends USKA Heavyweight title.
|-
|
|Win
| style="text-align:left" |  Norman Barkoot
|2nd United Nations Open Karate Championships
|New York City, New York, USA
|KO
| 1
| 1:25
|4–0
|Defends USKA Heavyweight title.
|-
|
|Win
| style="text-align:left" |  Wally Slocki
|Toronto Karate Championships
|Toronto, Ontario, Canada 
|KO (knee)
| 3
| 0:25
|3–0
|
|-
|
|Win
| style="text-align:left" |  Ed Daniel
|US Pro Open Karate Championships 
|Dallas, Texas, USA
|KO
| 2
| 1:00
|2–0
|Defends USKA Heavyweight title.
|-
|
|Win
| style="text-align:left" |  Greg Baines
|US Pro Team Karate Championships
|Long Beach, California, USA
|KO (punches)
| 2
| 0:59
|1–0
|Wins USKA Heavyweight title.
|-
| colspan=10 | Legend:

See also

List of male kickboxers
United States Kickboxing Association
Professional Karate Association
 Joe Lewis Memorial Page

References

External links

1944 births
2012 deaths
American male kickboxers
Kickboxers from North Carolina
Heavyweight kickboxers
American male karateka
United States Marines
United States Marine Corps personnel of the Vietnam War
Martial arts school founders
American Jeet Kune Do practitioners
People from Knightdale, North Carolina
Deaths from cancer in Pennsylvania
Deaths from brain cancer in the United States
Shōrin-ryū practitioners